Robert Blythe (1947 – 20 November 2018), also known as Bob Blythe, was a Welsh actor and voice over artist. He was brought up in Tan-y-groes St in Port Talbot. He was best known for playing Richard 'Fagin' Hepplewhite in the Welsh situation comedy High Hopes.

Career
Prior to training as an actor at the Arts Educational Trust in London, he was a surveyor.

His theatre work included repertory seasons at the Haymarket Theatre, Leicester, the Sherman Theatre, Cardiff, the Liverpool Playhouse, the Connaught Theatre, Worthing, and the Grand Theatre, Swansea. He also toured the Far East, Middle East, India and Europe with various productions.

His work at the Royal National Theatre included Henry IV, Part 1 and Part 2, Henry V, Mother Clap's Molly House, and Under Milk Wood.

He was an associate artist of Clwyd Theatr Cymru where his credits included, the Life of Galileo, Barnaby and the Old Boys, Cabaret, Equus, Entertaining Mr Sloane, A Christmas Carol, The Journey of Mary Kelly, The Norman Conquests, King Lear, Bedroom Farce, The Rabbit, One Flew over the Cuckoo's Nest, A Chorus of Disapproval, and An Inspector Calls.

Other theatre included Badfinger at the Donmar Warehouse and on tour, Ghosts at the Royal Exchange Theatre, Manchester, House and Garden for Alan Ayckbourn at the Stephen Joseph Theatre, Scarborough and Twelve Angry Men at the Garrick Theatre, London.

Personal life
Blythe was married to actress Iola Gregory; one of their children, Rhian Blythe, is an actress . Their eldest daughter, Angharad Blythe is a writer and TV producer.

Blythe later remarried Charlie (Naomi) Blythe. They had two sons together - Sam Blythe and Jack Blythe.

Selected filmography
1980: The Mouse and the Woman .... Corporal
1982: Giro City .... Welsh Policeman
1982: Experience Preferred... But Not Essential .... Ivan
 1983 The Forgotten Story (TV Series) .... Martin
1985-1986: Troubles and Strife (TV Series) .... Harry Price
1986: Whoops Apocalypse .... Guard with Egg in Mouth
1987: The Love Child .... Elvis
1991-2004: The Bill (TV Series) .... Ryan Moone / Leo Nelson / Philips / Mr. Wyatt
1992: Rebecca's Daughters .... Sgt. Bridges
1994: The Lifeboat (TV Series) .... George Bibby
1994-2006: Casualty (TV Series) .... Gareth Mart / Trevor Harris
1995: The Englishman who Went up a Hill but Came down a Mountain .... Ivor
1996: Darklands .... McCullen
1997: The Woodlanders .... Young Timothy Tangs
1998: The Theory of Flight .... Farmer
1999: High Hopes (pilot) .... Richard 'Fagin' Hepplewhite
2002-2009: High Hopes (TV Series) .... Richard 'Fagin' Hepplewhite
2004: Little Britain (TV Series)
2005: Lie Still .... Martin Stone
2005-2013: Doctors (TV Series) .... Eric Birne / Derek Dunsdale / Bob Callaway / Gwilym Llwyd
2007: Midsomer Murders (TV Series) .... George Miller
2007: The Royal (TV Series) .... Eric Darnby
2011: There Be Dragons (director Roland Joffe) .... Archbishop Valencia
2016: Love Is Thicker Than Water .... George
2017: An Ordinary Man .... Grocer (final film role)

References

External links
 

1947 births
2018 deaths
Welsh male actors
Welsh male film actors
Welsh male television actors
People from Port Talbot